Bodangora Wind Farm is a 113.2 MW wind farm owned by Infigen Energy in the district of Bodangora near Wellington, New South Wales, Australia. It consists of 33 wind turbines. The towers are 85 metres tall, and the rotor diameter is 130 metres. The wind turbine blades were manufactured in Bergama, Turkey. The development of the project began in 2009. It received planning approval in August 2013. The wind farm was completed on 27 February 2019. Annually it is supposed to generate on average 361 GWh of energy at capacity factor of 36.4%.

Bodangora Wind Farm has a power purchase agreement to sell 60% of the electricity generated to EnergyAustralia until the end of 2030.

Operations 
The wind farm began grid commissioning in October 2018 and was fully commissioned in December 2018 and has operated continuously since then. The generation table uses eljmkt nemlog to obtain generation values for each month. 

Note: Asterisk indicates power output was limited during the month.

References

Wind farms in New South Wales